Gracie Humaitá or Academia Gracie de Jiu-Jitsu is a Brazilian Jiu-Jitsu academy on Humaitá Street, in Botafogo, Rio de Janeiro, Brazil, founded by  Helio Gracie. The Academy offers classes in Gracie Jiu-Jitsu.

History
The Academia Gracie was founded by Carlos Gracie on April 18, 1952 at Avenida Rio Branco 151 on the 17th and 18th floors. The original instructors were Carlson Gracie, Robson Gracie, Joao Alberto Barreto and Helio Vigio. They were supervised by Helio Gracie. In 1981 the academy moved to Lagoa for a couple of years before establishing itself inside the Colégio Padre Antonio Vieira, a private Catholic school. Today the school focuses primarily in Sport Jiu-Jitsu, but also does training competitors for a career in MMA.

The gym is currently run by Hélio's sons, Royler and Rolker Gracie. Almost all of the fighters in the famous Gracie family, including Rickson, have trained at the school extensively.

On November 17, 2009 the Gracie Competition Team Academy opened for business in San Diego, California. The academy is affiliated with Royler Gracie and Gracie Humaita and is run by Professor Regis Lebre and  Royler Gracie frequently  conducts classes.

Notable students
Notable students of the Academia Gracie de Jiu-Jitsu include:

 Rorion Gracie - 9th Degree Red Belt, Co-Founder of the Ultimate Fighting Championship. Teaches Jiu-Jitsu in California.
 Relson Gracie - 9th Degree Red Belt, Teaches Jiu-Jitsu in Hawaii.
 Rickson Gracie - 9th Degree Red Belt, Vale Tudo Japan Champion.
 Carlos Gracie, Jr. - 8th Degree Red & Black Belt, Head of Gracie Barra
 Royler Gracie - 7th Degree Red & Black Belt, ADCC  Submission Wrestling World Champion, Instructor at Gracie Humaitá in Brazil and at Gracie Competition Team Academy in San Diego, California.
 Royce Gracie - 7th Degree Red & Black Belt, The first Ultimate Fighting Champion.
 Rolls Gracie - 6th Degree Black Belt, died in 1982 hang-gliding accident.
 Carlos "Caique" Elias - 7th degree Red & Black Belt, head of the Caique Jiu Jitsu network of schools. Teaches Jiu-Jitsu in Lomita, California
 Megaton Dias - 5th Degree Black Belt, Teaches Jiu-Jitsu in Arizona.
 Saulo Ribeiro - 5th Degree Black Belt, Teaches Jiu-Jitsu in San Diego, former 6-time World Jiu-Jitsu Champion
 Mauricio Villardo - 6th Degree Black Belt, former instructor at Gracie Humaita, Rio de Janeiro, Brazil.
 Leonardo Xavier - 4th Degree Black Belt, Teaches Jiu-Jitsu in Sugar Land, Texas.  Multiple time world medalist and former instructor at Gracie Humaita in Brazil.
 Alexandre Ribeiro - 4th Degree Black Belt; taught Jiu-Jitsu in Toledo OH, San Diego, CA and Los Angeles CA. Currently teaches Jiu-jitsu in San Diego with his brother Saulo Ribeiro
 Leticia Ribeiro - 4th Degree Black Belt, One of the highest ranking female Brazilian Jiu-Jitsu black belts in the world, Teaches Jiu-Jitsu in San Diego, CA.
 Kron Gracie- 1st Degree Black belt, Son of Rickson Gracie. 2nd Place Light Weight Black belt World Jiu-Jitsu Championship 2011. ADCC 2013 champion. Teaches Jiu-Jitsu in Los Angeles

See also
List of Top Professional MMA Training Camps

References

External links 
Academia Gracie de Jiu Jitsu
Gracie Humaita (Association Website)
Gracie Humaitá MARanking profile Statistics and BJJ (GI) main titles since 2004

1952 establishments in Brazil
Brazilian jiu-jitsu organizations
Brazilian jiu-jitsu training facilities